Summertime Blues is the third album posthumously released by Eddie Cochran in the United States after Cochran's death in 1960.

Content
The album was released on the Sunset Records label in August 1966 in both stereo and mono. The catalogue number was SUS-5123 for the stereo version and SUM-1123 for the mono version.

Track listing
Side 1
 "Summertime Blues" (Eddie Cochran - Jerry Capehart)
 "Stockins 'n Shoes (Bare foot Rock)" (Lyle Gaston)
 "Proud Of You" (Dale Fitzsimmons)
 "Lovin' Time" (Jan Woolsey)
 "Completely Sweet" (Eddie Cochran - Jerry Capehart)

Side 2
 "One Kiss" (Eddie Cochran - Johnny Russell (singer))
 "Mean When I'm Mad" (Eddie Cochran - Jerry Capehart)
 "Tell Me Why" (Eddie Cochran)
 "Undying Love" (Eddie Cochran - Jerry Capehart)
 "Lonely" (Eddie Cochran - Sharon Sheeley)

Notes

Eddie Cochran albums
1966 compilation albums
Sunset Records compilation albums